Doves are an English indie rock band formed in Manchester. The band is composed of twin brothers Jez Williams (guitar, vocals) and Andy Williams (drums, vocals), and Jimi Goodwin (bass, vocals, guitar). Additionally, the band employs Martin Rebelski, as a touring and session musician on keyboards. The band released four studio albums between 2000 and 2009, two of which reached #1 on the UK album charts. A compilation album, The Places Between: The Best of Doves, was released in April 2010.

Doves went on hiatus in 2010. During this time Goodwin released his first solo album, Odludek (2014), while the Williams brothers regrouped as Black Rivers. In December 2018, Doves announced they were ending their hiatus by performing for the Teenage Cancer Trust at London's Royal Albert Hall on 29 March 2019. Further festivals, including some dates with Noel Gallagher, were subsequently announced. The band released two new songs: "Carousels" and "Prisoners", in June and July 2020 respectively. Their fifth studio album The Universal Want was released in September 2020.

History

Formation as Sub Sub (1991–1998) 

The Williams brothers and Goodwin met at high school at age 15. All three members played in various local bands during the timeframe, with their paths occasionally crossing. After meeting again at The Haçienda in 1989, the three formed Sub Sub, releasing their first single "Space Face" in 1991. In 1993 they released "Ain't No Love (Ain't No Use)," which reached No. 3 in the UK Singles Chart. On the Williams twins' birthday in February 1996, the band's Ancoats studio caught fire and burned down, leading the band members to abandon their previous dance-oriented style and start afresh as alternative rock band Doves in 1998. On the band's change of direction, Jez Williams said: "We were faced with a really black and white decision: throw the towel in or carry on. And if you're going to carry on, you've got to put everything into it to justify it, because before that you've lost everything. That was quite a liberating feeling, actually."

Lost Souls and The Last Broadcast 1998–2003
The band released three EPs in 1998 and 1999 on Casino Records, a subsidiary of Rob Gretton's Rob's Records, which established the group's new sound and met with a warm critical response. Their debut album Lost Souls in April 2000 was nominated for the Mercury Music Prize, which they lost to fellow Mancunian and former collaborator Badly Drawn Boy.

Doves' second album The Last Broadcast was released two years later, reaching No. 1 on the UK Albums Chart, and was again nominated for the Mercury Music Prize. The album's first single "There Goes the Fear" became the band's highest-charting single to date, reaching No. 3 on the UK Singles Chart despite only being released for one day before it was deleted. The album's second single "Pounding" reached No. 21 on the Singles Chart and was used in the Vancouver 2010 Winter Olympics With Glowing Hearts/Des Plus Brillants Exploits advertisement campaign and in pre-event intros.

In 2003, the band released a B-sides compilation, Lost Sides, and a DVD entitled Where We're Calling From. The DVD included all of their music videos to date, as well as incidental videos played before the start of their Lost Souls and The Last Broadcast tours. Also on the DVD was a live concert video of the band's gig at Cornwall's Eden Project, recorded in Summer 2002, as well as documentary videos about Doves as well as Sub Sub.

Some Cities and Kingdom of Rust (2003–2009)
Doves recorded Some Cities, their third studio album, away from urban influences, and in cottages tucked away in the countryside of Snowdonia, Darlington, and around Loch Ness. "Lyrically, the theme of cities and towns and change started cropping up a lot... which was strange because we were recording and writing in the countryside, but it started taking this real urban shape," said Jimi Goodwin. Some Cities was released in February 2005 and went straight to No. 1 in the UK Albums Chart, aided by some of the strongest reviews they had received to date. The album was preceded by the single "Black and White Town," which reached No. 6 on the Singles Chart. On 18 June 2005, the band opened for U2 at Twickenham Stadium in London. They also supported Oasis at the City of Manchester Stadium on their triumphant return to Manchester, and Coldplay at the Reebok Stadium in Bolton, both during their respective 2005 tours.

The band's fourth album, Kingdom of Rust, was released in April 2009. Prior to the new release, Doves offered a free download of the album's lead track "Jetstream" on their website. On 27 January 2009 the band announced a week's worth of tour dates from 12–19 March, in which new album tracks made their debuts. The eleven songs on the album were described by Jez Williams as "schizophrenic, but... also strangely cohesive." The band have subsequently stated that writing and recording the album was the most difficult and fractious of their career. Worldwide tours, including multiple tours of the United Kingdom, United States and Canada, followed the album's release. On 12 July 2009 the band appeared on the Radio 1 stage at T in the Park and the festival Latitude in Southwold. They also appeared with the London Bulgarian Choir as part of the BBC Electric Proms series in October 2009.

The band's first best of compilation, entitled The Places Between: The Best of Doves was released on 5 April 2010.

An interview with the band regarding their history and Jodrell Bank performance was posted on The Guardians website on 4 April 2010. Doves toured the UK throughout May 2010, and performed at the Isle of Wight Festival 2010.

Hiatus and side-projects (2010–2018)
The band took a break from recording in 2010, according to an interview with The Daily Record. Jimi Goodwin stated: "It's nice just to have a bit of breathing space... We just wanted to get off that whole album-tour-album-tour treadmill. None of us are ready to face going into the studio for another two years. This is wiping the slate clean, we have nothing else in the vaults now. That is it. Whatever we do from now on will be a new start."

On 2 October 2012, EMI International released a Doves anthology titled 5 Album Set featuring all four studio albums from Lost Souls to Kingdom of Rust and the 2003 re-issue of Lost Sides.

In March 2014, Jimi Goodwin released his first solo album, entitled Odludek. In July 2014, Jez and Andy Williams announced they formed a new band, Black Rivers.

Reformation and The Universal Want (2018–2020)
At the end of 2018 the band members announced a series of gigs for 2019 and a tentative plan to explore new music together. As the series neared conclusion, Doves posted on Facebook that the 31 August 2019 and 6 September 2019 shows would be the last two concerts until they completed their new album.

On 18 June 2020, the band released their first new music in ten years with a song entitled "Carousels". It and "Prisoners", released on 9 July, are from their new album, The Universal Want, which was released on 11 September 2020 and charted at number 1 in its first week. In October 2021, the band cancelled their upcoming tour, making a statement that "performing live isn't possible for us at this time or in the immediate future".

Band members
Band
Jez Williams – guitar, vocals
Jimi Goodwin – bass, lead vocals, guitar
Andy Williams – drums, vocals

Touring
Martin Rebelski – keyboards

DiscographyStudio albums'''
 Lost Souls (2000)
 The Last Broadcast (2002)
 Some Cities (2005)
 Kingdom of Rust (2009)
 The Universal Want'' (2020)

References

Post-Britpop groups
Musical groups from Cheshire
Heavenly Recordings artists
Musical groups established in 1998
English alternative rock groups
English indie rock groups
Sibling musical groups
British musical trios